Autoroute 25 may refer to:
 A25 autoroute, in France
 Quebec Autoroute 25, in Quebec, Canada

See also  
 A25 roads
 List of highways numbered 25